Celltech Group plc was a leading British-based biotechnology business based in Slough. It was listed on the London Stock Exchange and was a constituent of the FTSE 100 Index.

History
Celltech was founded by Gerard Fairtlough in 1980 with finance from the National Enterprise Board.  Amongst the work conducted at Celltech was the cloning of the glutamine synthetase (GS) gene in CHO cells leading to the creation of a biotechnology tool still widely used to express recombinant eukaryotic proteins.

In 1999 Celltech led consolidation in the UK biosciences market merging with Chiroscience plc, after which it was briefly referred to as Celltech Chiroscience, and then buying Medeva plc. Then in 2000 it bought Cistron, a US biosciences business. It expanded into Germany in 2001 buying Thiemann, a German biosciences business, and went on to buy Oxford Glycosciences in July 2003 for £102m. Celltech was acquired by UCB, a Belgian drugmaker, in 2004. Since then it has been known as UCB Celltech.

Operations
The Company was engaged in research and development of therapies for patients with serious diseases. Products included:
 Tussionex for coughs
 Zaroxolyn for resistant edema
 Methylphenidate for ADHD
 Amphetamine for ADHD and narcolepsy, as 5 mg Dexedrine tablets
 Semprex-D, an antihistamine and decongestant
 Inotuzumab ozogamicin and gemtuzumab ozogamicin, both through Celltech's collaboration with Wyeth.

See also
 Pharmaceutical industry in the United Kingdom

References

Pharmaceutical companies established in 1980
Companies based in Slough
Companies formerly listed on the London Stock Exchange
1980 establishments in England
Pharmaceutical companies disestablished in 2004
2004 disestablishments in England